Bjni Fortress, is a medieval Armenian fortress located in the village of Bjni in the Kotayk Province of Armenia. It sits upon the top and along the sides of a mesa that divides the village nearly in half. The larger portion of which is located west of the mesa and curves south, while a smaller portion is east. The walls of the fortress may only be seen from the western side of the village, and are easiest reached via a narrow dirt road that forks (take the left fork) and goes up the side of the hill past some residences.

History 
The fortress of Bjni was built in the 9th to 10th centuries by the royal Pahlavuni family of the Bagratuni Dynasty.  The commander of Bjni, lord Vasak Holum Pahlavuni (the Pahlavid) reconstructed the fortress.  The 12th century Armenian historian Matteos Urhayetsi wrote in part 1 of the "Chronicle" covering the late 10th to early 11th centuries, of the invasions of mercenary Turkish soldiers of the Daylamis at Bjni in 1021 who went to raid and plunder villages and towns.

Vasak and his men became furious and pursued the enemy forces into battle near the Kasakh River killing 300 of them and causing the rest to flee.  After becoming exhausted from the fighting, Vasak left the battle to find a place to rest at a mountain called Serkevelo.  One of the villagers who had fled the scene, saw the commander asleep and struck him with a heavy blow.  He then threw Vasak from one of the high rocks, killing him.

During the years 1387–88 the Turko-Mongol conqueror Timur Lenk destroyed the village of Bjni and most likely the castle as well. In manuscripts written by Thomas of Metsoph from the late 14th to mid-15th centuries, he left an account of Timur's invasions stating that,

Site 
Portions of the exterior fortification walls at Bjni have survived and  follow the sides of the mesa. At the plateau, there are sections of battlements that remain in relatively poor condition. Traces of where the foundations of structures had once stood are indicated by depressions in the ground at various areas. There is also the stone foundation of a church of the 5th century, a medieval structure that is still partially standing (currently being rebuilt as of 2009), two cisterns one with the remains of intact vaulting, and a covered passage that led to the river in the event of a siege.

Gallery

See also 
 Bjni, Armenia

References

Further reading

External links 

 Bjni Fortress
 About Bjni Fortress
 Thomas of Metsoph: History of Timur and His Successors

Archaeological sites in Armenia
Castles in Armenia
Forts in Armenia
Tourist attractions in Kotayk Province
Buildings and structures in Kotayk Province